Cockfield Fell railway station was a railway station on the  to  section of the South Durham and Lancashire Union Railway that served the village of Cockfield, County Durham, North East England from 1863 to 1962.

History 
The station was opened as Cockfield on 1 August 1863 by the North Eastern Railway on the route the SD&LUR, one of its predecessors. The suffix Fell was later added to the station's name on 1 July 1923 to avoid confusion with another London and North Eastern Railway station in Suffolk of the same name. It closed to passengers on 15 September 1958 and to goods traffic on 18 June 1962.

References

External links 

Disused railway stations in County Durham
Former North Eastern Railway (UK) stations
Railway stations in Great Britain opened in 1863
Railway stations in Great Britain closed in 1958
1863 establishments in England
1962 disestablishments in England
Cockfield, County Durham